Red House Lake is an artificial lake located within Allegany State Park in Red House, New York. Fish species present in the lakes are brown trout, rainbow trout, and brook trout. There is a state owned beach launch located 6 miles south of Salamanca. No motors are allowed on the lake.

Red House Lake was originally the site of the Red House town government before it was flooded in the 1920s. The town center was moved to outside the park, first to a site near the railroad and the Allegheny River, then to what was then known as Baystate in the 1970s after the Kinzua Dam was built.

References 

Lakes of Cattaraugus County, New York
Lakes of New York (state)